Verongula rigida is a sponge species in the class Demospongiae. The scientific name of the species was first validly published in 1794 by Eugenius Johann Christoph Esper, as Spongia rigida.

See also
5-Bromo-DMT
5-6-Dibromo-DMT
Hallucinogenic fish

References

rigida
Animals described in 1794